Raymond Dalmau Coliseum is a multi-purpose indoor arena located in Quebradillas, Puerto Rico. Amongst other uses, it is home to Piratas de Quebradillas, which competes in Puerto Rico's Baloncesto Superior Nacional, the territory's top basketball league. The Coliseum had its grand opening in 2008, hosted by Puerto Rican governor Aníbal Acevedo Vilá and the mayor of Quebradillas, Heriberto Vélez Vélez. Basketball and Badminton events for the 2010 Central American and Caribbean Games were held in this Coliseum.

References

External links

Indoor arenas in Puerto Rico
Basketball venues in Puerto Rico
2010 Central American and Caribbean Games venues
2008 establishments in Puerto Rico
Sports venues completed in 2008